This list of banks in Finland below was assembled using publicly available information from the Finnish Financial Supervisory Authority and the Finnish Bankers' Association. In 2014, according to the calculations of the National Bank, Finland had 5641 branches of cooperative banks.

Government banks
 Bank of Finland, the central bank of Finland, a member of the Eurosystem and the European System of Central Banks
 The Nordic Investment Bank is an international financial institution owned by the eight NIB member countries: Denmark, Estonia, Finland, Iceland, Latvia, Lithuania, Norway and Sweden. The NIB does not do retail banking, only long-term loans and guarantees to private and public projects to strengthen competitiveness and enhance the environment.

Commercial banks

Foreign banks
Carnegie Investment Bank
Citibank
Crédit Agricole Corporate and Investment Bank
Danske Bank (Finnish operations acquired through a merger with the originally Finnish Sampo Bank)
Deutsche Bank
DnB NOR
Handelsbanken
Forex Bank
Skandinaviska Enskilda Banken
Swedbank

Savings banks
The Finnish Savings Banks Group consists of 40 savings banks, each of which operates in its own region and is an independent legal entity. They share a common inheritance and common operating practices. The primary strategy for the banks in the group is to serve clients on a regional basis and thus not compete. The market share of the Finnish Savings Banks is about 8,5% as measured by deposits.

Co-operative banks

OP-Pohjola Group
The OP-Pohjola Group is a central corporation of co-operative banks. The member cooperative banks of the OP-Pohjola Group are independent, local deposit banks that are engaged in retail banking. There are 229 member cooperative banks, each operating in a local region.

Local Cooperative Bank Group

The Finnish Local Cooperative Bank Group consists of 42 independent co-operative banks, each operating in its own region. The group was established in 1997 to enable the member banks to continue operating independently as the other co-operative bank group in Finland was seen as too centrally administered.

Defunct banks

Aktiebanken för Utrikeshandel (1919–1924) - acquired by Helsingin Osakepankki
Atlas Pankki (1918–1929) (Pohjois-Suomen Pankki Osakeyhtiö 1918-1923) - acquired by Helsingin Osakepankki
Borgå Sparbank (1842–1992) - merged with Aktia Bank
Etelä-Suomen Pankki (1917–1928) - acquired by Liittopankki
Helsingfors Folkbank (Helsingin Kansanpankki Oy) (1889–1896) - reorganized as Privatbanken i Helsingfors
Helsingfors Sparbank (1825–1991) - merged with Bromarf-, Hangö-, Ingå-, Karis-Pojo-, Sibbo-, Sjundeå- and Tenala Sparbank to form Aktia Bank
Helsingin Diskonttopankki (1918–1921) - bankrupted
Helsingin Osakepankki (1912–1986) - acquired by Suomen Yhdyspankki
Helsingin Suomalainen Säästöpankki (1901–1992) - merged with Suomen Säästöpankki SSP
Helsingin Työväen Säästöpankki (1909–1970) - merged with other banks to form Suomen Työväen Säästöpankki
Hämeen Työväen Säästöpankki (1914–1970) - merged with other banks to form Suomen Työväen Säästöpankki
Interbank Osakepankki (1988–1998) - merged with Mandatum Bank
Kannaksen Yhtyneet Säästöpankit (1939–1951) - merged with Helsingin Suomalainen Säästöpankki
Kansallis-Osake-Pankki (1889–1995) - merged with Suomen Yhdyspankki, forming Merita Bank
Kymenlaakson Työväen Säästöpankki (1909–1970) (1909–1945 Kyminlaakson Työväen Säästöpankki, 1946–1955 Kotkan Työväen Säästöpankki) - merged with other banks to form Suomen Työväen Säästöpankki
Landtmannabanken (1909–1920) - merged with Wasa Aktie Bank and Turun Osake-Pankki, forming Suomen Liittopankki
Lappeenrannan Työväen Säästöpankki (1912–1970) (1912–1932 Etelä-Saimaan Työläisten Osuuspankki) - merged with other banks to form Suomen Työväen Säästöpankki
Leonia Pankki (1997–2000) - merged with Sampo Insurance to form Sampo-Leonia, in 2001 renamed Sampo Pankki
Liikepankki (1919–1923) - remains of Liikepankki and Suomen Vakuus Oy, continued operating as Turunmaan Pankki
Liittopankki (1920–1931) - acquired by Helsingin Osakepankki
Luotto-Pankki (1917–1933) - acquired by Kansallis-Osake-Pankki
Länsi-Suomen Osake-Pankki (1912–1929) - merged with Tampereen Osake-Pankki and Maakuntain Keskus-Pankki, forming Maakuntain Pankki
Maakiinteistöpankki (Landsfastighetsbanken Ab) (1916–1934)
Maakuntain-Pankki (1929–1932) - acquired by Kansallis-Osake-Pankki
Mandatum Pankki (1992–2001) - acquired by Sampo Pankki, Mandatum name used within Sampo Pankki until 2008
Merita Bank (1995–2002) - merged in 1997 with Swedish Nordbanken, forming MeritaNordbanken
MeritaNordbanken - merged in 2000 with Danish Unibank and Norwegian Christiania Bank og Kreditkasse, forming Nordea
Nykarleby Aktiebank (1898–1913) - bankrupted
Nylands Aktiebank (Uudenmaan Osake-Pankki) (1912–1919) - acquired by Helsingin Osakepankki
Oulun Työväen Säästöpankki (1932–1970) - merged with other banks to form Suomen Työväen Säästöpankki
Peruspankki (1963–1990) - merged with STS-pankki
Pohjolan Osake-Pankki (1916–1949/1971) - acquired by Kansallis-Osake-Pankki
Pohjoismaiden Osakepankki Kauppaa ja Teollisuutta varten (1912–1919) - acquired by Suomen Yhdyspankki
Postipankki (1887–1997) (Postisäästöpankki 1887–1970) - merged with Suomen Vientiluotto, forming Leonia Pankki
Privatbanken i Helsingfors (1896–1922) - acquired by Suomen Yhdyspankki
Sakkolan Säästöpankki (1903–1939?) - merged with Kannaksen Yhtyneet Säästöpankit and then Helsingin Suomalainen Säästöpankki after the war
Savo-Karjalan Osake-Pankki (1916–1952) - liquidated
Sofia Bank (2009–2010) - bankrupted
STS-Pankki (1970–1992) (1970–1989 Suomen Työväen Säästöpankki) - acquired by Kansallis-Osake-Pankki
Suomen Kauppapankki (1912–1924) - acquired by Helsingin Osakepankki
Suomen Kiinteistöpankki (Fastighetsbanken i Finland Ab) (1912–44)
Suomen Käsityöläis-Osakepankki (1917–1945) - acquired by Suomen Yhdyspankki
Suomen Liittopankki - renamed to Liittopankki in 1924
Suomen Maatalous-Osake-Pankki (1916–1958) - acquired by Kansallis-Osake-Pankki
Suomen Säästöpankki SSP (1992–1993) - liquidated
Suomen Teollisuuspankki (Suomen Teollisuus-Hypoteekkipankki 1924–1976) (1924-1998) - merged with Merita Pankki
Suomen Vienti-Pankki (1920–1931) (1920–1923 Paloheimo & Co Pankki Osakeyhtiö) - bankrupted
Suomen Yhdyspankki (1862–1995) - merged with Kansallis-Osake-Pankki, forming Merita Bank
Säästöpankkien Keskus-Osake-Pankki (1908–1991) - liquidated by Bank of Finland
Tampereen Osake-Pankki (1898–1929) - merged with Länsi-Suomen Osake-Pankki and Maakuntain Keskus-Pankki, forming Maakuntain Pankki
Turunmaan Pankki (Åbolands Bank) (1923–1934) - bankrupted
Turun Osakepankki (1896–1920) - merged with Wasa Aktie Bank and Landtmannabanken, forming Suomen Liittopankki
Viipurin Suomalainen Säästöpankki (1902-1940/1948) - merged with Kotkan Säästöpankki
Viipurin Työväen Säästöpankki (1910–1944) - merged with Kyminlaakson Työväen Säästöpankki 
Wasa Aktie Bank (1879–1920) - merged with Turun Osakepankki and Landtmannabanken, forming Suomen Liittopankki
Vasa Sparbank (1847–1992) - merged with Aktia Bank
Viborgs Sparbank (1846–?)

References

 
Banks
Finland
Banks
Finland